The men's 4 x 100 metres relay at the 2008 African Championships in Athletics was held on May 2.

Results

External links
Results (Archived)

2008 African Championships in Athletics
Relays at the African Championships in Athletics